 

This is a list of known military operations of the Vietnam War in 1975, conducted by the armed forces of the United States.

See also
 Vietnam War casualties
 Aircraft losses of the Vietnam War

References

External links
 HELICOPTER Operations in VIETNAM
 Special Operations in Vietnam
 Information About Records Relating to the Vietnam War Operations Analysis (OPSANAL) System

1975
Military operations involving the United States
Military operations involving Vietnam
Operations 1975
 
1975 in Vietnam
List of allied military operations of the Vietnam War